The BNXT League Defensive Player of the Year award is given annually at the end of the regular season of the BNXT League, the highest professional basketball league in Belgium and the Netherlands, to the player who has excelled defensively throughout the season.

The current award, given by the BNXT League, began when that league started, with the 2021–22 season.

BNXT League Defensive Player of the Year winners (2022–present)

Player nationalities by national team:

References

External links
BNXT League - Official Site
BNXT League - Official Award Page
BNXT League at Eurobasket.com

European basketball awards
BNXT League basketball awards